Serbian Left may refer to:

 Serbian Left (2015), defunct political party in Serbia
 Serbian Left (2022), a political party in Serbia led by Radoslav Milojičić